The First Presbyterian Church is a Late Gothic Revival-style basilica plan historic church located at 212 North Bonner Street in Ruston, Louisiana.

Built in 1923–24, its walls are Flemish bond brick trimmed with limestone.  It has a side tower with a crenelated top and a needled spire made of sheet metal.  It a crenellated porch topped by a lancet window.

The church was added to the National Register of Historic Places on January 12, 1984.

See also
 National Register of Historic Places listings in Lincoln Parish, Louisiana

References

Presbyterian churches in Louisiana
Churches on the National Register of Historic Places in Louisiana
Gothic Revival church buildings in Louisiana
Churches completed in 1924
Buildings and structures in Lincoln Parish, Louisiana
National Register of Historic Places in Lincoln Parish, Louisiana
1924 establishments in Louisiana